Doriclea is an opera in three acts and a prologue by the Italian composer Francesco Cavalli with a libretto by Giovanni Faustini. It was first performed at the Teatro San Cassiano, Venice in 1645.

References
Source
 Brenac, Jean-Claude, Le magazine de l'opéra baroque on perso.orange.fr  Retrieved 9 September 2011

Operas
Operas by Francesco Cavalli
1645 operas
Opera world premieres at the Teatro San Cassiano
Italian-language operas